Kabalo Airport  is an airport serving the town of Kabalo, in the Tanganyika Province of Democratic Republic of the Congo.

See also

Transport in the Democratic Republic of the Congo
List of airports in the Democratic Republic of the Congo

References

External links
 FallingRain - Kabalo Airport
 HERE Maps - Kabalo
 OpenStreetMap - Kabalo
 OurAirports - Kabalo Airport
 

Airports in Tanganyika Province